The eighth and final season of the American sitcom Black-ish premiered on January 4, 2014, on ABC, for the 2021–22 television season and concluded on April 19, 2022.

Black-ish centers around the African-American Johnson family, led by Andre "Dre" Johnson, who struggles with finding his cultural identity while raising his kids in a white neighborhood with his wife, Bow. The series stars Anthony Anderson as Dre, alongside Tracee Ellis Ross, Marcus Scribner, Miles Brown, Marsai Martin, Peter Mackenzie, Deon Cole, Jeff Meacham, Katlyn Nichol, and Jenifer Lewis.

Cast and characters

Main
 Anthony Anderson as Andre "Dre" Johnson
 Tracee Ellis Ross as Rainbow "Bow" Johnson
 Marcus Scribner as Andre ("Junior") Johnson Jr.
 Miles Brown as Jack Johnson
 Marsai Martin as Diane Johnson
 Peter Mackenzie as Leslie Stevens
 Deon Cole as Charlie Telphy
 Jeff Meacham as Josh Oppenhol
 Katlyn Nichol as Olivia Lockhart
 Jenifer Lewis as Ruby Johnson

Recurring cast
 Laurence Fishburne as Earl "Pops" Johnson
 Yara Shahidi as Zoey Johnson
 Nicole Sullivan as Janine
 Reid Scott as Griffin

Guest cast
 Michelle Obama as herself
 Stephen A. Smith as himself
 Dwight Howard as himself
 DeAndre Jordan as himself
 Magic Johnson as himself
 Montrezl Harrell as himself
 Vivica A. Fox as herself
 Daveed Diggs as Johan Johnson
 Babyface as himself
 Anna Deavere Smith as Alicia Johnson
 Simone Biles as herself

Episodes

Production

Development
On May 14, 2021, it was announced that ABC had renewed Black-ish for an eighth and final season. Production on the series had concluded by December 2021.

Casting
On October 28, 2021, it was announced that Michelle Obama would guest-star in an episode of the season as herself. Obama's appearance was later revealed to be in the season premiere, "That's What Friends Are For".

Marketing and Release
When ABC announced their fall schedule for 2022, it was revealed that the series would be held for mid-season. On November 1, 2021, it was announced that would premiere on January 4, 2022. The season airs after first seasons of Judge Steve Harvey and Abbott Elementary, and lead into first season of Queens. A retro-style promo for the season was aired during the third installment of Live in Front of a Studio Audience, on December 7, 2021. The promotional poster for the season was released in November 2021.

Ratings

References

2022 American television seasons
Black-ish